Torelli–Assure–Cayman Islands–Scimitar is an Irish women's road cycling team that was founded in 2017, before registering with the UCI for the 2022 season.

Major results
2018
Stage 2 Ras na mBan, Rhona Callander
UCI Track Cycling World – Berlin (Team pursuit), Emily Kay

National champions
2017
 National Track (Team sprint), Autumn Collins

2019
 National Track (Omnium), Lydia Boylan
 National Track (Madison), Autumn Collins

2021
 National Junior Road Race, Aoife O'Brien

References

Cycling teams based in Ireland
Cycling teams established in 2017